Hribar is a Slovene surname. Notable people with the surname include:

Ivan Hribar (1851–1941), Slovenian banker, politician, diplomat and journalist
Spomenka Hribar (born 1941), Slovenian philosopher and writer
Tine Hribar (born 1941), Slovenian philosopher
Vida Jeraj Hribar (1902–2002), Slovenian classical violinist
Andraž Hribar (born 1975), Slovenian musician, artist and businessman 

Slovene-language surnames